The gang de la Brise de Mer was one of the most powerful Corsican criminal organizations. Based in Northern Corsica, the gang controls various activities (racketeering, slots machines traffic, laundering, night clubs, gambling clubs, casinos, etc.) in Corsica, but also in the South of France, in Paris, in Italy, in Occidental African countries (Gabon, Mali, Cameroon, etc.), and in Latin American countries.

The gang's moniker came from a Bastia cafe called La Brise de Mer ("the sea breeze"), where they held meetings throughout the 1970s.

The gang is well known for its spectacular, violent armed robberies in Corsica, France and the rest of Europe. The robbery of the UBS bank in Geneva, Switzerland in 1990; the attack on a Securipost trunk in 1991 and the robbery of Air France Mercure in 1992 are probably the most important robberies of the gang.

The "Brise de Mer" is also suspected of involvement in the murders in 2001 of members of Armata Corsa, a separatist Corsican armed group.

Around ten families or clans constitute the "Brise de Mer" organization. Its capital is estimated to be between 120 and 150 million Euros. This money is invested in Corsica (in illegal activities like racketeering etc. but also legal activities like tourism and construction business) and the rest of France, through the running of night clubs, bars and illegal slots machines (principally in the Southern France cities like Marseille, Aix-en-Provence, Toulon) and gambling clubs in Paris. Other investments are casino activities in Africa, Latin America and Italy.

In 2001, several gangsters escaped from a prison near Bastia by sending fake faxes from a judge ordering their release.

Since 2008, several important suspected members of the gang (Richard Casanova, Daniel Vittini, Francis Mariani, Pierre-Marie Santucci) have been killed during violent conflicts among the various Corsican gangs.

References

1970s establishments in France
Corsican mafia
Transnational organized crime
Organized crime groups in France
Organised crime groups in Italy